Pilot Talk III is the seventh studio album by American rapper Curren$y. It was released through his own label Jet Life Recordings on April 4, 2015. It is the third release of his Pilot Talk album series. The album features guest appearances from Riff Raff, Wiz Khalifa, Jadakiss, Styles P and J. Townsend. The album was exclusively released through the Jet Life website through a pre-order pack, and will be released digitally and physically at a later date.

Critical response 

Pilot Talk 3 was met with generally favorable reviews from music critics. At Metacritic, which assigns a normalized rating out of 100 to reviews from critics, the album received an average score of 78, which indicates "generally favorable reviews", based on 4 reviews. Pitchfork Media's Julian Kimble wrote that, "Curren$y may not do 'new,' but he is very good at what he does: riffing on cars, money, women, weed, and obscure moments from television shows."
Michael Madden from Consequence of Sound said, "There’s virtually nothing not to like about Pilot Talk III. Like other Curren$y releases, it makes up for its lack of revelations with a contagious joyfulness."

Kellan Miller from HipHopDX said, "While other artists are constantly on the prowl for the latest trend that will keep their names relevant, Spitta never ventures out of his own lane, and yet, his latest material never seems to spoil."
Complex's B.J. Steiner said, "As the third installment of Spitta’s aircraft-themed series, Pilot Talk 3 finds the NOLA sky captain delivering a familiar set of luxury rap fairytales upon which he’s built a quietly impressive career."

Track listing

References

2015 albums
Currensy albums
Albums produced by Jahlil Beats
Albums produced by Ski Beatz
Albums produced by Cool & Dre
Albums produced by Harry Fraud
Sequel albums